Kalateh Hajji Ata (also Romanized as Kalāteh Hājjī ‘Aţā; also known as Ḩājjī ‘Atā, Haji Ata, Hāji Atta, Ḩâjji Aţţā’, and Hājjī ‘Aţţār) is a village in Darmian Rural District, in the Central District of Darmian County, South Khorasan Province, Iran. At the 2006 census, its population was 97, in 27 families.

References 

Populated places in Darmian County